The Bravery Council of Australia Meeting 83 Honours List was announced by the Governor General of Australia, Sir Peter Cosgrove on 19 August 2015.

Awards were announced for 
the  Star of Courage,
the Bravery Medal,
Commendation for Brave Conduct and
Group Bravery Citation.

Star of Courage (SC)

 Pilot Officer James Wallace Hocking - Queensland.

Bravery Medal (BM)

Mustafa Ruhi Akkan -Sydney, New South Wales
Murray Charles Barnewall - Port Campbell, Victoria.
Senior Constable Benjamin Douglas Bjarnesen - Queensland Police Service
Elissa Marie Clarke - Adelaide, South Australia.
Assistant Commissioner Michal James Condon  - Queensland Police Service.
Ashley Ryan Coster - Cloverlea, Victoria.
Timothy Shaun Coster - Cloverlea, Victoria.
Jackson Douglas Hillier - Bonbeach, Victoria.
Soichi Kawabata - Victoria.
Senior Sergeant Peter Gerhard Liebig - Queensland Police Service.
Brendan Lys - Queensland.
Jai McKneil - Gladstone, Queensland.
Senior Sergeant Christopher Maskell - Queensland Police Service.
Ryan Alexander Nally - Queensland.
Senior Constable Nigel Ross O'Keefe - Queensland Police Service.
Senior Sergeant Michael James Pearson  - Queensland Police Service.
Nattapat Penpanussak - Annandale, New South Wales.
 Senior Constable David James Rixton - New South Wales Police Force
Thomas James Smith - Cloverlea, Victoria.
Aleziah Spiers - South Australia.
Jamie Alan Strong - Berry, New South Wales.
Constable Cameron Wallace - Victoria Police
Senior Constable Joel Michael Whittred - Queensland Police Service.
Leading Senior Constable Jenny Ann Wiltshire - Victoria Police.
Joseph Zaghini - Severnlea, Victoria.

Commendation for Brave Conduct

Senior Constable Teresa Elizabeth Anderson - Queensland Police Service.
Senior Constable Shane Grey Ashton - Queensland Police Service.
Constable Megan Jane Brunton - Queensland Police Service.
Mario Casa - Oakleigh South, Victora.
Daniel Luke Coster - Cloverlea, Victoria.
Robert Edward Coster - Cloverlea, Victoria.
William Edward Denny - Rostrevor, South Australia.
Robin Jeffrey Everden - Molloy Island, Western Australia.
Lieutenant Colonel Graham Malcolm Goodwin - South Australia.
Dylan Reece Hodge - Rockhampton, Queensland.
Michael William Jones - New South Wales
Jeffrey Edward Jorgensen - Springfield Lakes, Queensland.
Jeremy Adrian Linton - Montrose, Victoria
Andrew James Lock  - Canberra, Australian Capital Territory.
Mark Anthony McCarthy - Collie, Western Australia.
Alan Robert Milner - Strathfieldsaye, Victoria.
Senior Constable Leonard Joseph Moroney - Queensland Police Service.
John Arron North - Kings Park, Victoria.
Adrian James Pendergast - Eight Mile Plains, Queensland.
Salvatore Raciti - Melbourne, Victoria.
Robert William Starbuck - Doreen, Victoria.
Carter Davis Travis - Queensland.
Bruce Richard Waldron - Coooibah, Queensland.

Group Bravery Citation
For a collective act of bravery, by a group of persons in extraordinary circumstances, that is considered worthy of recognition.

Awardees are three members of the Marine Rescue, Ballina who went to the rescue of two people after their boat failed in turbulent water at Ballina, New South Wales on 15 April 2013.
Rodney Hugh Guest - East Ballina, New South Wales.
Tony Brian Handcock - Ballina, New South Wales.
David Jamieson Nockolds - Ballina, New South Wales.

Detective Senior Constable Peter John Bowser - Queensland Police Service.
Assistant Commissioner Michael James Condon  - Queensland Police Service.
Senior Sergeant Peter Gerhard Liebig - Queensland Police Service.
Senior Sergeant Michael James Pearson  - Queensland Police Service.
Sergeant Paul David Williams - Queensland Police Service.
Joseph Zaghini - Servernlea, Queensland.

Senior Constable Benjamin Douglas Bjarnesen - Queensland Police Service
Senior Constable Michael Charles Hewitt - Queensland Police Service.
Constable Stuart Benjamin Mitcheley - Queensland Police Service.
James Charles Perren - Queensland.

Detective Senior Constable Jon Allan Murray.
Constable Brent James Schultz.
Senior Constable Donita Maree Stains
Senior Constable Ryan Barry Thompson.

Senior Sergeant Daryl Elliott Green.
Senior Constable Sharnelle Patricia Harris.
Sergeant Christopher John Mulhall.
Sergeant Brett Andrew Price.

Richard Vincent Ashton - Toowoomba, Queensland.
Geo Parakalayil George - Ooralea, Queensland.
Duncan Grills - Queensland.
Linda Susan Herbertson - Murphy's Creek, Queensland.
Thomas James McGovern - Toowoomba, Queensland.
Thomas Mathew - Glenvale, Queensland.

References

Orders, decorations, and medals of Australia
2015 awards